Tracy (Wilbur) High Continuation School is a public continuation school in Cerritos, California, serving grades 9-12. It is part of ABC Unified School District. The school has a teen parent program which gives teen parents the skill they need to raise a child.

References

ABC Unified School District
High schools in Los Angeles County, California
Public high schools in California